Popovci is a settlement south of Ptuj in the Municipality of Videm in eastern Slovenia. It extends from the left bank of the Dravinja River to the right bank of the Polskava. The area traditionally belonged to the Styria region. It is now included in the Drava Statistical Region.

References

External links
Popovci on Geopedia

Populated places in the Municipality of Videm